The 2006 ECM Prague Open, known also as 2006 ECM Prague Open by Ceska Sporitelna for sponsorship reasons, was a professional tennis tournament played on clay courts at the I. Czech Lawn Tennis Club in Prague, Czech Republic from 8 to 14 May 2006. It was the 15th edition of the men's tournament which was part of the 2006 ATP Challenger Series and the 5th edition of the women's tournament which was part of the 2006 WTA Tour as a Tier IV tournament.

Points and prize money

Note: this information was only available for the women's tournament

Point distribution

Prize money

* per team

Men's singles entrants

Seeds

1 Source: ATP

Other entrants

The following players received wildcards into the singles main draw:
  Dušan Karol
  Michal Navrátil
  Wolfgang Schranz
  Mike Steinherr

The following players received entry from the qualifying draw:
  Konstantinos Economidis
  Jan Hájek
  Petr Kralert
  Simone Vagnozzi

The following players received entry as special exempts:
  Marcel Granollers-Pujol (reached the final at Ostrava last week)
  Lamine Ouahab (won in Tunis last week)

Men's doubles entrants

Seeds

Other entrants

The following pairs received wildcards into the doubles main draw:
  Martin Damm /  Dušan Karol
  Jan Hájek /  Dušan Lojda
  Miloslav Navrátil /  Filip Zeman

The following pair received entry from the qualifying draw:
  Florin Mergea /  Andrei Pavel

Women's singles entrants

Seeds

1 Rankings as of 1 May 2006.

Other entrants

The following players received wildcards into the singles main draw:
  Nikola Fraňková
  Magdaléna Rybáriková
  Barbora Strýcová

The following players received entry from the qualifying draw:
  Victoria Azarenka
  Natalie Grandin
  Michaela Paštiková
  Agnieszka Radwańska

Women's doubles entrants

Seeds

1 Rankings as of 1 May 2006.

Other entrants

The following pair received a wildcard into the doubles main draw:
  Nikola Fraňková /  Kateřina Vaňková

The following pair received entry from the qualifying draw:
  Kristina Brandi /  Aleke Tsoubanos

Finals

Men's singles

  Robin Vik defeated  Jan Hajek, 6–4, 7–6(7–4)

Men's doubles

  Petr Pála /  David Škoch defeated  Ramón Delgado /  Sergio Roitman, 6–0, 6–0

Women's singles

  Shahar Pe'er defeated  Samantha Stosur, 4–6, 6–2, 6–1
It was the 2nd singles title for Pe'er in the season and her career.

Women's doubles

  Marion Bartoli /  Shahar Pe'er defeated  Ashley Harkleroad /  Bethanie Mattek, 6–4, 6–4
It was the 3rd title for Bartoli and the 1st title for Pe'er in their respective doubles careers.

References

External links
 Official Results Archive (ATP)
 Official Results Archive (WTA)

Prague Open
Prague Open
Prague Open
May 2006 sports events in Europe
Prague